Yvette Espinosa (1911–1992) was an English ballerina. She was born in England, the daughter of Eve Louise Kelland and Edouard Espinosa, founder of the British Ballet Organization.

Following her success as a performer and teacher, she joined her brother, Edward Kelland-Espinosa, in devoting her career to developing the BBO and raising the standard of teaching throughout the country and abroad.

References

1911 births
1992 deaths
British ballerinas
Ballet teachers
20th-century British ballet dancers